Live From Amsterdam is a live album released by Big L in 2003, recorded on October 8, 1998. The album features A.G., and consists of live material of tracks by Big L & A.G. and an a cappella, and an unreleased verse of Big L's debut Devil's Son.

Track listing

Big L albums
Live albums published posthumously
2000 live albums